Training Air Wing Five (TW-5 or TRAWING 5) is a United States Navy aircraft training air wing based at Naval Air Station Whiting Field, in Milton, FL. TW-5 is one of five training wings in the Naval Air Training Command, and consists of three fixed-wing primary training squadrons and three rotary-wing advanced training squadrons. The wing trains Student Naval Aviators from the U.S. Navy, U.S. Marine Corps, and U.S. Coast Guard, as well as international allies with instructors of varying backgrounds and seniority from the aforementioned military branches.

According to the Chief of Naval Air Training (CNATRA), TW-5 accounts for roughly 43% of all flight time within the Naval Air Training Command, and 11% of the Navy and Marine Corps' flight time worldwide. Approximately 1,200 students complete flight training with TW-5 annually.

Subordinate units

TW-5 consists of three fixed-wing primary training squadrons and three rotary-wing advanced training squadrons.
Each training Squadron has a single Yellow in color aircraft, which signifies the Instructor, the Instructor Wears a yellow and White Flight Suit, in order to distinct himself.

Current force

Fixed-wing aircraft
 T-6B Texan

Rotary wing aircraft
 TH-57B/C Sea Ranger

References

External links
  Training Air Wing Five Official site

Air wings of the United States Navy